Hendri Christian Rust (born 7 April 1992) is a South African rugby union player for El Salvador in the División de Honor in Spain. His regular position is fly-half, but he can also play outside centre or fullback.

Career

Youth

He played for their Under-16 side at the 2008 Grant Khomo Week, which also led to his inclusion in the South African Under-16 Elite Squad in the same year. He then played at Under-18 level for SWD at the 2009 Academy Week tournament and in the 2010 Craven Week competition.

He played for the  side in the 2011 Under-19 Provincial Championship competition and for the  side in the 2012 Under-21 Provincial Championship competition.

While he was named in their squad for the 2013 Vodacom Cup, he never made an appearance for the Bloemfontein-based side.

Senior career

Rust returned to the Western Cape in 2014, where he was included in the  side for the 2014 Vodacom Cup.

References

1992 births
Living people
People from Malmesbury, Western Cape
White South African people
South African rugby union players
Rugby union fly-halves
Boland Cavaliers players
Rugby union players from the Western Cape